"After Dark" is the third single from Little Birdy's second album Hollywood. It was confirmed as the third single by the band on their official MySpace blog . It has been described as "a song that hints at the spellbinding nocturnal intrigue of the album as a whole."  The videoclip for the song was first aired on ABC TV's rage on 12 May 2007.  The videoclip was directed by Paul Goldman, who also directed the videoclip for "Beautiful to Me", and Alice Bell.

Track listing

References

External links
 Little Birdy web site

2007 singles
Little Birdy songs
2006 songs
Eleven: A Music Company singles
Songs written by Katy Steele